Altküla may refer to several places in Estonia:

Altküla, Harju County, village in Padise Parish, Harju County
Altküla, Ida-Viru County, village in Toila Parish, Ida-Viru County
Altküla, Pärnu County, village in Halinga Parish, Pärnu County
Altküla, Rapla County, village in Märjamaa Parish, Rapla County

See also
Alaküla (disambiguation)